Melissa Hortman (born May 27, 1970) is an American politician and the Speaker of the Minnesota House of Representatives. A member of the Minnesota Democratic–Farmer–Labor Party (DFL), she represents District 36B, which includes portions of Anoka and Hennepin counties in the Twin Cities metropolitan area. Prior to the 2018 elections, she served as Minority Leader of the Minnesota House of Representatives.

Education
Hortman graduated from Blaine High School in Blaine, Minnesota in 1988.  She earned bachelor's degrees in Political Science and Philosophy from Boston University, graduating magna cum laude in 1991, earned a Juris Doctor from the University of Minnesota Law School, cum laude, in 1995, and a Master of Public Administration from the Harvard Kennedy School in 2018.

Minnesota House of Representatives
Hortman won her first term by narrowly defeating Republican incumbent Stephanie Olsen in the 2004 general election by 402 votes out of over 20,000 cast. She had previously lost to Olsen in the 2002 election. She has been re-elected every two years since then.

In her first term, Hortman was an outspoken advocate for the Northstar Commuter Rail line, which runs through her district. She also supported a new stadium for the Minnesota Twins. She has been an advocate of environmental issues and in the effort to bring the 2020 Summer Olympics to Minnesota. She is pro-choice, supports gun control policies, and opposes voter identification initiatives. In 2008, Hortman managed the DFL floor operation during a successful attempt to override then-Governor Tim Pawlenty's veto of a gas tax increase. She was chair of the House Energy Policy Committee during the 2013-14 biennium, and was the chief author of the state's solar energy standard and community solar laws.

Hortman was elected by her peers to serve as assistant majority leader after the 2006 election, and served in that capacity through 2010. She was later elected as speaker pro tempore of the Minnesota House and served from 2013 through 2014. From 2017 through 2018, she was elected by her caucus to be minority leader. After the DFL caucus gained enough seats in the 2018 election to retake the House majority, her colleagues elected her speaker of the house.

Electoral history

Honors and accolades
Hortman has won awards for her bipartisan work from the 2020 Caucus. She has also won awards from Conservation Minnesota.

Personal life
Hortman is Catholic and has taught Sunday school in Blaine.

References

External links

 Official House of Representatives website
 Official campaign website

|-

1970 births
21st-century American politicians
21st-century American women politicians
Boston University College of Arts and Sciences alumni
Harvard Kennedy School alumni
Living people
People from Brooklyn Park, Minnesota
People from Fridley, Minnesota
Speakers of the Minnesota House of Representatives
Democratic Party members of the Minnesota House of Representatives
University of Minnesota Law School alumni
Women state legislators in Minnesota